The following major companies either have headquarters or other significant interests in the City of Sunderland, North East England.

 Arriva
 Barclays Bank
 Berghaus
 Bernard Matthews Ltd 
 Calsonic Kansei
 CitiGroup (CitiFinancial)
 EDF Energy
 Faurecia
 Hays Travel
 HQ Furnishings
 Johnson Controls
 Lear
 LG Electronics the Washington DY plant closed in 2003
 Liebherr
 Littlewoods
 Lloyds TSB
 Nike
 Nissan the NMUK car plant produces the Qashqai, Juke and the Leaf
 Northern Rock
 Regus
 Royal & Sun Alliance (More Than)
 ScS
 Saggezza
 Stagecoach North East headquarters located on Dundas Street
 T-Mobile
 TRW
 Valeo
 Virtual Website Design Ltd ]]

See also

 Economy of England
 Lists of companies

Sunderland
Sunderland